Mitt julalbum is a Henrik Åberg Christmas album released on 12 November 2014.

Track listing
Jag kommer hem igen till julen
Blue Christmas
On a Snowy Christmas Night
Christmas is Here
När ljusen ska tändas därhemma (When It's Lamp Lighting Time in the Valley)
White Christmas
Winter Wonderland
Silent Night (Stille Nacht, heilige Nacht)
When the Snow is on the Roses
Here Comes Canta Claus (Right Down Santa Claus Lane)
In My Fathers House (with Ray Walker from The Jordanaires)
O helga natt (Cantique de Noël)

Charts

References

2014 Christmas albums
Henrik Åberg albums
Christmas albums by Swedish artists
Rock Christmas albums